Telestes muticellus is a species of ray-finned fish in the family Cyprinidae. Commonly known as vairone, it is found in France, Italy, and Switzerland.

Its natural habitats are rivers and intermittent rivers. It is not considered threatened by the IUCN.

References

Telestes
Fish described in 1837
Taxa named by Charles Lucien Bonaparte
Taxonomy articles created by Polbot